Aeron is used in several ways including:

People
Given name
Aeron Clement (1936–1989), American science fiction author
 

Fictional characters
Aeron Azzameen, only daughter of the Azzameen family from the video game, Star Wars: X-Wing Alliance
Aeron Greyjoy, character from the novel series, A Song of Ice and Fire

Places
Aeron (kingdom), early Brythonic kingdom in northern Britain
Ciliau Aeron, small village near Aberaeron in Ceredigion, Wales
Nova Aeron, an Austrian paraglider design
River Aeron, small river that flows into Cardigan Bay
Ystrad Aeron, small village between Lampeter and Aberaeron, Wales

Other uses
Aeron (Celtic mythology), aka Agronā, Welsh river, possibly named for an ancient female spirit or goddess of battle and slaughter
Aeron chair, product of Herman Miller designed in 1994
Aeron Express, hand powered cable ferry in the Welsh coastal town of Aberaeron
Alejandra and Aeron, artists based in Oslo, Norway

Welsh unisex given names